The Best American Poetry 1989, a volume in The Best American Poetry series, was edited by David Lehman and by guest editor Donald Hall.

One of the poems Hall selected for this edition was written by his wife, Jane Kenyon. Hall also selected one of his own poems as one of the 75 best American poems of the year.

Poets and poems included

See also
 1989 in poetry

Notes

External links
 Web page for contents of the book, with links to each publication where the poems originally appeared

Best American Poetry series
1989 poetry books
American poetry anthologies